Captain Roop Singh Stadium, is a cricket ground in Gwalior, Madhya Pradesh. The stadium has hosted 12 ODI matches, the first one was played between India and West Indies on 22 January 1988.

The ground has flood lights and has hosted day-night encounters. It can hold 18,000 people. It was originally a hockey stadium
named after great Indian hockey player Roop Singh.

Ground profile

The stadium's first one-day international was held in 1988, when West Indies beat India by 73 runs, a match in which Narendra Hirwani made his one-day debut. Floodlights were installed in preparation for the 1996 Cricket World Cup fixture, also between India and West Indies. The stadium was also the venue for the first and only day-night Ranji Trophy final in 1996. The match was played
between Mumbai and Delhi over five days and Mumbai won on the basis of a first-innings lead.

The pitch at the Captain Roop Singh Stadium has traditionally favoured the batsmen. In eight of the 10 ODIs, the team batting first has scored over 250. It has also been very lucky for most of the cricketers from India in India, especially Sachin Ramesh Tendulkar.

A pavilion at the Captain Roop Singh Stadium is named after Sachin Tendulkar who made the history by becoming the first cricketer to score a double century in ODI.

Matches hosted

One Match of the 1996 Cricket World Cup was also played on this ground between India and West Indies.

In May 1998, Kenya beat India by 69 runs in ODI for first time. As Kenya sailed confidently into the final of Coca-Cola Triangular Series.

It was their fifth win at this level, and their second over a Test nation. Ravindu Shah notching his third fifty in only his fourth one-day international, dominated the first phase of the innings. When he fell for 70 including 50 in boundaries, the score was 93. For once, Kenya built on their sound start.

Maurice Odumbe peppered his 91-ball 83 with five sixes, while Hitesh Modi contributed a run-a-ball fifty. In India's reply, eight batsmen made it to double figures, but none beyond 33. Maurice Odumbe followed his biggest score in one-day internationals with his best bowling, taking three for 14 with his off-spin.

In February 2010, in a match between India and South Africa where India scored 401/3 and Sachin Tendulkar became the first male cricketer ever to score a double century in an ODI ending on 200
not out.  This match was comfortably won by India by 153 runs,
where South Africa was bowled out for 248 in
42.5 Overs.

Cricket World Cups
This stadium has hosted One Day International (ODI) match for 1996 Cricket World Cup , when India was a host/co-host.

ICC World Cup 1996, 5th Match, Group B

List of Centuries

Key
 * denotes that the batsman was not out.
 Inns. denotes the number of the innings in the match.
 Balls denotes the number of balls faced in an innings.
 NR denotes that the number of balls was not recorded.
 Parentheses next to the player's score denotes his century number at Edgbaston.
 The column title Date refers to the date the match started.
 The column title Result refers to the player's team result

One Day Internationals

International cricket five-wicket hauls

ODIs

See also
 Madhya Pradesh cricket team
 Holkar Cricket Stadium

References

External links
 Cricinfo Website – Ground Page
 cricketarchive Website – Ground Page

Cricket grounds in Madhya Pradesh
Multi-purpose stadiums in India
Sports venues in Gwalior
1996 Cricket World Cup stadiums
Sports venues completed in 1978
1978 establishments in Madhya Pradesh
20th-century architecture in India